Hipólito Boaventura Caron (1862–1892) was a Brazilian painter and designer associated with the "Grupo Grimm".

Biography
He began his education at the Colégio Progresso in Juiz de Fora. In 1880, he enrolled at the Academia Imperial de Belas Artes, where he studied with Georg Grimm while he taught elementary drawing classes at the "Liceu de Artes e Ofícios".

In 1883, he had his first exhibition at the Juiz de Fora City Hall. Later that same year, he and several others withdrew from the Academy to go to Niteroi with Grimm, where they established an outdoor school devoted to plein-air painting. Among his associates there were Giovanni Battista Castagneto, Antônio Parreiras, Domingo García y Vásquez and Grimm's friend from Germany, Thomas Georg Driendl.

In 1884, he won a Gold Medal at the Exposição Geral de Belas Artes. The following year, thanks to financial assistance from his family, he was able to visit France, where he studied with the landscape painter Hector Hanoteau. He remained there for three years, travelling throughout Brittany and Normandy.

Upon his return, he toured Minas Gerais and received several commissions for decorations, including murals at the old theater in Juiz de Fora and the newspaper offices of O Farol (The Beacon). From 1890 to 1891, he lived in Sabará, which had briefly been the home of his mentor, Grimm. Continuing to travel between Minas Gerais and Juiz de Fora, working on commissions, he returned from one trip ill with yellow fever and died soon after.

References

Further reading
 . O Grupo Grimm; paisagismo brasileiro no século XIX. Rio de Janeiro: Pinakotheke, 1980.

External links

 ArteData: Carón Sesquicentennial. Biography by Carlos Roberto Maciel Levy, with additional paintings.

1862 births
1892 deaths
Landscape painters
19th-century Brazilian painters
19th-century Brazilian male artists
People from Resende